Kip King (born Jerome Charles Kattan; August 11, 1937 – July 15, 2010) was an American film, television and voice actor. He was the father of American television sketch comedian Chris Kattan.

Life and career

King was born Jerome Charles Kattan in Chicago, Illinois, the son of an Iraqi-Jewish father and a Polish-Jewish mother. His father, who was from Baghdad, was a letter carrier for T.E. Lawrence.

King was probably best known for voicing Tailor Smurf in the 1980s television cartoon series The Smurfs. Long associated with Hanna-Barbera, King provided the voice of Shecky in The Biskitts (1983). He was also in the voice casts of The Little Rascals (1982), Scooby-Doo and Scrappy-Doo (1979-1980), Tom & Jerry Kids (1990), Droopy, Master Detective and the Flintstones TV special I Yabba-Dabba Do! (both 1993).

He also made many guest appearances in films and on television shows such as Diff'rent Strokes, Corky Romano, Bachelor Father, The Munsters Today, One Day at a Time, Dragnet (both 1954 and 1989 versions), Burke's Law, The Bronx Zoo, Mister Roberts, Babylon 5: Thirdspace, Barney Miller, Mister Ed, The Bill Cosby Show, My Living Doll, The Beverly Hillbillies, Ben Casey, Mannix, The Rifleman, America 2-Night, Reno 911!, 12 O'Clock High, More Than Friends, Small Wonder, Breast Men, The Fall Guy, Burke's Law, Cagney and Lacey, The Partridge Family and The Jeffersons. He also wrote the teleplay for an episode of The Betty Hutton Show.

King was an original member of The Groundlings comedy troupe.

King died on July 15, 2010, after a long illness.

Filmography

Animated roles
 Droopy, Master Detective - Additional Voices
 Scooby-Doo and Scrappy-Doo - Additional Voices
 The Biskitts - Shecky
 The Scooby & Scrappy-Doo/Puppy Hour - Additional Voices
 The Smurfs - Tailor Smurf
 Timeless Tales from Hallmark - Various Characters
 Tom & Jerry Kids - Additional Voices

Live-action roles
 12 O'Clock High - Sgt. Weinstock
 America 2-Night - Rabbi Shecky Stein
 Babylon 5: Thirdspace - Leo
 Bachelor Father - Ansel
 Barney Miller - Nicholas Baskin, Paul Powell
 Batman - Nick
 Ben Casey - Victor
 Big Town
 Bollywood Hero - Himself
 Bosom Buddies - Budd Shore
 Burke's Law - Skins
 Captain Nice
 Cagney and Lacey - Businessman
 Call Me Claus - Rabbi Rosenfarb
 Charlie and Company - Ronald Sandler
 The Real McCoys - Spookie
 Diff'rent Strokes - Dr. Padnick
 Don't Call Me Charlie! - Irving (1963 – unaired episode)
 Dragnet - Johnny Colter (1956)
 Dragnet - Stan Gibbon (1989)
 EZ Streets - Insurance Adjuster
 Going My Way - Second Boy, Joey
 Halfway Home - Alan's Dad
 Handsome Harry's - Honest Stu Olsen
 High Sierra Search and Rescue
 Jack's Place
 Longstreet - Dr. Fowler
 Love, American Style (segment Love and the Nurse)
 Mannix - Dr. Kelly
 Man with a Camera - Ding Dong Fabrizi
 Medic - Lambert
 Mister Ed - Norman Howard
 Mister Roberts - Wiley
 More Than Friends - Lily Pad Pal
 Mr. Smith Goes to Washington - Emil, Bobo Bowman
 M Squad - Badger
 My Favorite Martian - Freddie Carson
 My Living Doll - Bellboy
 One Day at a Time - Mr. Neiman, Mr. Robters
 Out of This World - Dr. Stockman
 Reno 911! - Larry Plum
 Rosetti and Ryan: Men Who Love Women - Wardell
 Saturday Night Live - Jerome Mills (uncredited)
 Small Wonder - Kenny Hart
 The Beverly Hillbillies - Producer #3
 The Bill Cosby Show - Sam Cutter
 The Bronx Zoo - Uncle Louie
 The Eleventh Hour - Tom
 The Facts of Life - Florist
 The Fall Guy
 The Jeffersons - Mr. Mendelson
 The June Allyson Show - Ward
 The Munsters Today - Burt Fearman
 The Partridge Family - Second Musician
 The Proper Time - Jerry Rohn
 The Rifleman - Donnel O'Mahoney
 The Smothers Brothers Show - Messenger
 The Walter Winchell File - Freddy Lundberg

Film roles
 The Young Guns (1956) - Miguel (uncredited)
 Tea and Sympathy (1956) - Ted
 Dino - Allie (uncredited)
 Johnny Trouble (1957) - Kip King
 Kiss Them for Me (1957) - Marine (uncredited)
 Peyton Place (1957) - Pee Wee (uncredited)
 Rally 'Round the Flag, Boys! (1958) - Soldier (uncredited)
 Breakfast at Tiffany's (1961) - Delivery Boy (uncredited)
 Kid Galahad (1962) - Round Card Man for Romero, Galahad Fight (uncredited)
 The Proper Time (1962) - Jerry Rohn
 Thunder Alley (1967) - Dom
 Westworld (1974) - Technician #6
 Black Starlet (1974) - Commercial Director
 Murph the Surf (1975) - Party Guest #3
 Slumber Party '57 (1976) - School Teacher
 Scout's Honor (1980, TV Movie) - Mr. Appleorchard
 Student Confidential (1987) - Mr. Goldman
 Cyber-C.H.I.C. (1990) - Dr. Von Colon
 I Yabba-Dabba Do! (1993, TV Movie) - (voice)
 Breast Men (1997, TV Movie) - Barry Biggs
 A Night at the Roxbury (1998) - Flower Customer #2
 Perfumed Garden (2000) - Daerco
 Vice (2000) - Judge Roper
 Corky Romano (2001) - Dr. Kipper
 A Light in the Forest (2003) - Lowell Hawkins
 A Golightly Gathering (2009) - Himself
 Scouts Honor (2009) - Mr. Appleorchard (final film role)

References

External links

1937 births
2010 deaths
American male film actors
American people of Iraqi-Jewish descent
American people of Polish-Jewish descent
American male television actors
American male voice actors
Jewish American male actors
Male actors from Chicago
American Mizrahi Jews
21st-century Mizrahi Jews
20th-century Mizrahi Jews
21st-century American Jews